Frederick J. Iseman is an American businessman, philanthropist, and the founder of CI Capital Partners (formerly Caxton-Iseman Capital) private-equity firm.

Early life and education
Iseman is the son of Joseph S. Iseman, a noted New York City attorney and partner at Paul, Weiss, Rifkind, Wharton & Garrison LLP. He earned a B.A. in English literature from Yale College and is a member of its Elizabethan Club.

Career
Iseman founded Caxton-Iseman Capital LLC in partnership with Caxton Associates.  Caxton-Iseman Capital LLC announced on December 21, 2007, that it had completed its spin-off from Caxton Associates to form an independent private equity fund to be named CI Capital Partners LLC.  Frederick Iseman currently serves as the chairman and chief executive officer of CI Capital Partners LLC.

Iseman is a former chairman of CI Capital Partners' portfolio companies, including Ply Gem Industries, American Residential Services, Conney Safety Products, KIK Custom Products, and CoVant, Transplace, Tech Air, Interactive Health Solutions, Galls, IntraPac, A-T Solutions, Foundation Building Materials, and Total Fleet Solutions. Iseman is also a member of the advisory board of investment firm STAR Capital in London. Iseman was the chairman of Anteon International Corp. until Anteon's sale to General Dynamics Corp. in June 2006.

Philanthropy
Iseman sat on the boards of directors of the International Rescue Committee and was a member of the advisory board of the Nuclear Threat Initiative, whose chairman is former senator Sam Nunn. He currently serves on the international council of the Belfer Center for Science and International Affairs at the John F. Kennedy School of Government, Harvard University.

His philanthropic interests include medical research at Columbia-Presbyterian Medical Center, the Frederick Iseman Theater at Yale University, the Wharton Institute, the Taub Institute for Brain Research, oncology, immunology, and other disciplines. In 2014, he provided Yale with a $3 million endowment for creation of the Frederick Iseman Professor of Poetry faculty position.  

As a member of the board of directors of The Metropolitan Opera, Iseman underwrote the production of Dimitri Shostakovich's The Nose for the 2009–2010 season.  He was also on the board of trustees of Carnegie Hall and was chairman of the Mariinsky Foundation of America. Iseman is also a Harold Pratt Fellow of the Council on Foreign Relations and served on that Council's Independent Task Force on U.S. Nuclear Weapons Policy. He was the lead sponsor of the Yale Center for the Study of Globalization's 2008 conference on nuclear weapons. Iseman is a major supporter of Stanford University's Preventive Defense Project, a part of the Center for International Security and Cooperation at the Freeman Spogli Institute and the Yale Center for Genocide Studies. His support of the latter allowed Adam Jones to complete his book, Genocide: A Comprehensive Introduction.

References

Year of birth missing (living people)
Living people

American money managers
Harvard Kennedy School staff
Paul, Weiss, Rifkind, Wharton & Garrison people
People from the Upper East Side
Philanthropists from New York (state)
Private equity and venture capital investors
Yale College alumni